Giovanni Antonio Antolini (Castel Bolognese, 1756 – Bologna 1841) was an Italian architect and writer.

Biography
From 1803 to 1815, he was professor of architecture at the University of Bologna and thereafter at Milan's Brera Academy. He designed grandiose Neoclassical projects such as the Foro Bonaparte in Milan, which was never executed, and plans for the Procuratie buildings on St Mark's Square in Venice, which were modified and completed by others. He was also active in the field of hydraulics. His written works include Idee elementari di architettura civile (Elementary concepts of civil architecture, 1813) and Osservazioni ed aggiunte ai Principii di architettura civile di Francesco Milizia (Observations and additions concerning the Principles of civil architecture by Francesco Milizia, 1817).

Early life
When still quite young, he was taught geometry and hydraulics by the engineer Vincenzo Baruzzi. At the age of 20, he went to Rome. In 1776, he assisted with the drainage of the Pontine Marshes but, after catching malaria, soon returned to Rome. As a result, he decided to devote the rest of his career to architecture.

Architecture
Like many 18th-century Italian architects, Antolini was attracted by the study of ancient monuments, publishing an illustration of the Temple of Hercules in Cori. In 1796, he designed a triumphal arch with Doric columns for the city of Faenza dedicated to the glory of the French nation. Inaugurated in 1799, it was decorated with bas-reliefs by the sculptor Villafranca but was quickly destroyed by the Austrians. After the French returned, it was rebuilt to celebrate the Battle of Marengo but was then again demolished.

Foro Bonaparte

In 1801, after the French had returned to Milan, Antolini was commissioned to draw up plans for redesigning the city in the around the Sforza Castle which Napoleon had begun to demolish. Antolini, however, in his Foro Bonaparte (Bonaparte Forum) project which was inspired by the Forum of Ancient Rome and by the works of the French architect Claude Nicolas Ledoux, proposed keeping the core of the castle, adding a facing of Doric columns, and developing a vast circular plaza around, some 570 metres in diameter. Surrounded by a Doric colonnade, the plaza was to be bordered by administrative buildings, ministries, court houses, baths, theatres, universities and museums.

There were also plans for large areas to be devoted to commerce, the stores being connected through a system of canals to the city's Navigli. The main objective of the ambitious project was to move the city centre from the Piazza del Duomo, then surrounded by narrow medieval streets, to the newly planned Foro which would thus become the hub of city life.

Evaluated and modified several times by a special commission, the plans finally shelved owing to the sheer grandeur of the project. Although Napoleon was strongly behind it, it was finally deemed too ambitious for a city the size of Milan. The Foro Bonaparte plans were however not completely abandoned: once Antolini's design had been set aside, the project was entrusted to Luigi Canonica who completely reworked it into developing the area essentially for private residences.

Antolini's original plans were however considered to be one of the most important endeavors of Neoclassical architecture, so much so that the Foro Bonaparte was soon to inspire Naples' semicircular Piazza del Plebiscito with the church of San Francesco di Paola.

Piazza San Marco in Venice
In 1815, Antolini's plans for the rebuilding of the west end of St Mark's Square in Venice, where the old church of San Geminiano and extensions of the Procuratie Vecchie and Procuratie Nuove were demolished as part of Napoleonic schemes for alterations to the Piazza, also ran into trouble. The commission was finally given to the architect Giuseppe Maria Soli who radically altered Antolini's designs.

Later life
For political reasons, Antolini returned to Milan in 1815 where he taught architecture at the Brera Academy for the remainder of his life. He continued to author works on both hydraulics and architecture including proposals for straightening the River Topino in Umbria and designs for a bridge over the Tiber at Città di Castello. He died in Bologna on 11 March 1841.

References

External links

1756 births
1841 deaths
19th-century Italian architects
Architects from Bologna
Academic staff of Brera Academy